Esperiana esperi is a species of freshwater snail with an operculum, an aquatic gastropod mollusk in the family Melanopsidae.

Distribution 
Distribution of this species is Pontic.

This species is found in Austria, Belarus, Hungary, Moldova, Slovakia, and Ukraine.

Description

References

External links 

 AnimalBase info

Melanopsidae
Gastropods described in 1823
Taxonomy articles created by Polbot
Taxobox binomials not recognized by IUCN